The Superintendent of the United States Military Academy is the academy's commanding officer. This position is roughly equivalent to the chancellor or president of an American civilian university. The officer appointed is, by tradition, a graduate of the United States Military Academy, commonly known as "West Point". However, this is not an official requirement for the position.

The Superintendency had often been a stepping stone to higher prominence in the Army. Four Superintendents became Chief of Staff of the Army: Hugh Lenox Scott, Douglas MacArthur, Maxwell Davenport Taylor, and William Westmoreland. The list of Superintendents includes five Medal of Honor recipients: Oliver Otis Howard, Douglas MacArthur, Albert Leopold Mills, John McAllister Schofield, John Moulder Wilson. Many Superintendents later became Commanding Generals, such as Joseph Gardner Swift. The post is now a terminal assignment in the Army; as a condition for detail to the position, officers are required by law to acknowledge that they will retire at the end of their appointment. This formulation was meant to secure the independence of Superintendents from unlawful command influence; however, in practice the resulting "lame duck" status restricts their power and influence in the Army. Since 2010, the army has considered reverting to the previous system or recalling a retired officer to fill the post. The mandatory retirement precedent was not followed when Darryl A. Williams was nominated in June 2022 to serve as Commanding General, United States Army Europe and Africa.

The billet carries the rank of lieutenant general, and is not counted against the Army's statutory limit on the number of active-duty officers above the rank of major general. For example, General Andrew Goodpaster originally retired from active duty as a full general, was recalled to assume the superintendency as a lieutenant general, and reverted to his four-star rank upon his second retirement.


Superintendents
Note: "Class year" refers to the alumnus's class year, which usually is the same year they graduated. However, in times of war, classes often graduate early.
A "—" in the Class year column indicates a Superintendent who is not an alumnus of the Academy.

See also

 Superintendent of the United States Naval Academy
 Superintendent of the United States Air Force Academy

References
 General

 Inline citations

S
United States Military Academy
Superintendent
Academy alumni, famous list
West Point